Music of Mass Destruction is Anthrax's second full-length live album, and is packaged as one CD and one DVD. The songs were recorded on December 5 and 6, 2003, during performances at Chicago's Metro.

Cover art for the album was done by famous comic artist Alex Ross.

Track listing

Disc 1 (CD)
"What Doesn't Die" – 5:27
"Got the Time" – 3:25
"Caught in a Mosh" – 5:28
"Safe Home" – 5:37
"Room for One More" – 5:53
"Antisocial" – 4:51
"Nobody Knows Anything" – 4:04
"Fueled" – 4:26
"Inside Out" – 5:47
"Refuse to be Denied" – 5:11
"I Am the Law" – 6:10
"Only" – 5:28

Disc 2 (DVD)
"What Doesn't Die" – 4:37        
"Got the Time" – 3:18
"Caught in a Mosh" – 5:28
"Safe Home" – 5:36
"Room for One More" – 5:53
"Antisocial" – 4:51
"Nobody Knows Anything" – 4:04
"Belly of the Beast" – 4:26
"Inside Out" – 5:47
"Refuse to Be Denied" – 5:07
"604" – 0:35
"I Am the Law" – 6:09
"Only" – 5:28
"Be All, End All" – 7:10
"Indians" – 7:39
"Bring the Noise" (with extract of Metallica's "Whiplash") – 7:11

Bonus tracks
"Fueled" – 4:32
"Metal Thrashing Mad" (Neil Turbin, Scott Ian, Lilker) – 2:50

Personnel
John Bush – Lead Vocals
Rob Caggiano – Lead Guitar
Scott Ian – Rhythm Guitar, Backing Vocals
Frank Bello – Bass, Backing Vocals
Charlie Benante – Drums

Charts

References

Anthrax (American band) live albums
2004 live albums
2004 video albums
Live video albums
Sanctuary Records video albums
Sanctuary Records live albums
Albums with cover art by Alex Ross